Bogdan Gurdziecki (known in Persia as Bohtam Beg) (died April 12, 1700) was a Georgia-born Polish diplomat who served as the first permanent Polish resident in Safavid Persia.

Born in Georgia into a noble Georgian family, Gurdziecki served the Polish crown since the early 1650s. The surname derives from Turkish / Iranian name for Georgians "Gurdji". As the greatest authority on all things Persian, he was dispatched to Isfahan as a head of Polish diplomatic mission, part of the joint Russo-Polish diplomatic and economic efforts in Persia aimed at bringing the Safavid government into an anti-Ottoman alliance. Henceforth, Gurdziecki played a role in diplomacy between Poland and Persia as well as in some Russo-Georgian interaction. He died in Moscow in 1700.

See also
 Jerzy Ilicz

References 

1700 deaths
Polish diplomats
Polish people of Georgian descent
Year of birth unknown
Ambassadors of the Polish–Lithuanian Commonwealth to Safavid Iran